The Ganaraska River is a river in Northumberland County and the Regional Municipality of Durham in Southern Ontario, Canada. It is part of the Great Lakes Basin, and is a tributary of Lake Ontario, which it reaches at the central community of the municipality of Port Hope. The river's name is thought to be derived from Ganaraske, the Cayuga name for the village this Iroquoian nation had established in this area in 1779. 

Together with other nations of the Iroquois Confederacy, they had migrated from New York, forced to cede their homelands because of having allied with the British in the American Revolutionary War. The Crown provided additional lands to the Iroquois peoples, including what is now called the Six Nations of the Grand River reserve.

Later the Crown granted land here to United Empire Loyalists, in compensation for their losses in the Northeast colonies, especially New York. They were the first European Americans to settle here in any number.

Course
It flows southeast past the community of Kendal, takes in the left tributary North Ganaraska River, and turns south to its mouth on the north shore of Lake Ontario.

Watershed
Portions of the Ganaraska River drainage basin of  extend into the City of Kawartha Lakes; the Township of Cavan–Monaghan, Peterborough County; and the Township of Hamilton, Northumberland County.

Natural history
There have been major conservation efforts in recent years.

It attracts anglers for salmon and trout. The Ganaraska River Fishway, a fish ladder, allows rainbow trout to travel up river to spawn.

Flood of 1980
The river had a flood in 1980, that caused considerable damage to the Port Hope downtown area.

See also
Ganaraska Region
List of Ontario rivers

References

Sources

External links
 Ganaraska Region Conservation Authority
 Float Your Fanny official website

Rivers of Northumberland County, Ontario
Rivers of the Regional Municipality of Durham
Tributaries of Lake Ontario
Rivers with fish ladders